Uday Garudachar , is an Indian politician and member of the Karnataka Legislative Assembly since 2018. He is also a member of the Bharatiya Janata Party.
He joined Bharatiya Janata Party in 2008. He first contested in the Bihar Rajya Sabha election in 2008 but faced defeat. In 2013, he again contested for the Chickpet Assembly Constituency but faced defeat by a small margin of votes. Finally in 2018, he won the Chickpet Assembly Election.

Personal life

Dr. Uday B Garudachar is the son of Former IPS Officer, Mr. B N Garudachar and Late Mrs. Vatsala. B N Garudachar family hails from Bindiganavile Village Nagamangala Taluk Mandya district. he served as the Director General of Police (DGP). He completed SSLC at St. Paul's High School, Belagavi, Pre-university education at National PU College, Basavanagudi, Bangalore. He received a BE in Electronics from Bangalore University. he is also the recipient of doctoral degrees.
Uday Garudachar is married to Medini Uday Garudachar, who is a social activist and the Director of Garuda Group of Companies, Garuda Mall and the Founding Member of Garuda Foundation.

Political career

He joined Bharatiya Janata Party in 2008. first contested in the Bihar Rajya Sabha election in early 2008 but faced defeat. In 2013, he again contested for the Chickpet Assembly Constituency  but faced defeat by a small margin of votes. Finally in 2018, he won the Chickpet Assembly Election.

Portfolios head

 BJP State Executive Member from 2016 to present. 
 MLA - from 2018 to present ( Bharatiya Janata Party)

Awards
 Jnanasri Award 2013 - Akhila Karnataka Vipra Vanitha Pratishtana
 Chanakya National Award 2017 - Chaitanya International Arts Academy Trust 
 Nadaprabhu Kempe Gowda's Daughter-In-Law Sadhvi Lakshmi Devi Award
 Excellent Entrepreneur Award - Times Group
 Honorary Doctorate for  Implementing Affordable Housing for Economically deprived from Desh Bhagat University - Chandigarh, India. 
 Parashuram Award - Akhila Karnataka Ramanuja Seva Samiti

References
He belongs to Bharatiya Janata Party

External links
Elected in Bangalore, Karnataka

1959 births
Living people
Bharatiya Janata Party politicians from Karnataka